The following highways are numbered 898:

United States